Kamanda Mahadev or Kamadeshwar Mandir is one of the temples of Lord Shiva, located at a distance of 2 kilometres north of Satpuli in the Pauri Garhwal district of Uttarakhand, India.

Hindu temples in Uttarakhand
Shiva temples in Uttarakhand
Pauri Garhwal district